Barnum & Ringling, Inc. is a 1928 Our Gang short silent comedy film directed by Robert F. McGowan. It was the 74th Our Gang short that was released and the first to have a synchronized musical and sound-effects track. The short's title is a tongue-in-cheek reference to the Ringling Bros. and Barnum & Bailey Circus, which closed 89 years after the short was released.

Plot

Cast

The Gang
 Joe Cobb as Joe
 Jackie Condon as Jackie
 Jean Darling as Jean
 Allen Hoskins as Farina
 Bobby Hutchins as Wheezer
 Jay R. Smith as Jay
 Harry Spear as Harry
 Bobby Dean as Little Egypt
 Paul Toien as Our Gang member 
 Pete the Pup as Himself

Additional cast
 George B. French as Desk clerk
 William Gillespie as Hotel manager
 Oliver Hardy as Startled drunk
 Dorothy Coburn as Lady who sits on egg
 Charles King as Amorous young man
 Ham Kinsey as Bellboy
 Lillianne Leighton as Lady with goose in dress
 Edna Marion as Maid
 Eric Mayne as Bearded man in bed
 Charles A. Millsfield as Toothless Frenchman
 Patsy O'Byrne as Lobby extra
 Eugene Pallette as Hotel detective
 May Wallace as Dowager 
 Johnny Aber as Undetermined role
 Mildred Kornman as Undetermined role
 Retta Palmer as Undetermined role

See also
 Our Gang filmography

References

External links

1928 films
1928 short films
1928 comedy films
American silent short films
American black-and-white films
Films directed by Robert F. McGowan
Hal Roach Studios short films
Our Gang films
1920s American films
Silent American comedy films